The salivarius-1 RNA motif is a conserved RNA structure that was discovered by bioinformatics.
The salivarius-1 motif occurs in various strains of the species Lactobacillus salivarius, as well as some metagenomic sequences that come from unknown species.
salivarius-1 RNAs likely function in trans as small RNAs.  While most salivarius-1 RNAs are upstream of protein-coding genes, which could suggest a function as cis-regulatory elements, the downstream gene is often located far away.  Curiously, salivarius-1 RNAs are often located nearby to other salivarius-1 RNAs.

References

Non-coding RNA